Events in the year 1914 in Portugal.

Incumbents
President: Manuel de Arriaga
Prime Minister: Afonso Costa until 9 February; Bernardino Machado

Events
9 February – Bernardino Machado takes over as prime minister after Afonso Costa 
Integralismo Lusitano founded
Establishment of the political party Monarchist Cause.

Arts and entertainment

Sports
S.C. Espinho founded
Portimonense S.C. founded
U.F.C.I. Tomar founded
Vilanovense F.C. founded

Births
14 January – Álvaro Cardoso, footballer (d. 2004)
4 February – João Hogan, painter and printmaker (d. 1988)
30 June – Francisco da Costa Gomes, military officer and politician (died 2001)
7 August – Mariano Amaro, footballer (d. 1978 or 1987).
7 August – Kafunga, footballer (d. 1991)
9 August – Maria Keil, artist (d. 2012)
30 August – Joaquim Sampaio, sport shooter.
22 October – Constantino Esteves, film director (d. 1985)
20 December – Carlos Nunes, footballer

Full date missing
Maria José Marques da Silva, architect (d. 1996)

Deaths

9 March – José Luciano de Castro, politician (b. 1834)
13 September – Aniceto dos Reis Gonçalves Viana, writer and orientalist (b. 1840)

References

 
1910s in Portugal
Portugal
Years of the 20th century in Portugal
Portugal